ʿUtbān ibn Mālik (Arabic: عتبان بن مالك) was one of the companions of Muhammad.

In Medina, Muhammad declared him the "brother" of Umar

A Sunni site writes:

References

Companions of the Prophet